Edgard Derouet (26 October 1910 – 14 October 2001) was a French painter. His work was part of the painting event in the art competition at the 1948 Summer Olympics.

References

1910 births
2001 deaths
20th-century French painters
20th-century French male artists
French male painters
Olympic competitors in art competitions
People from Loiret